Sayyid Najabat Ali Khan Bahadur, born Mir Phulwari (1749 – March 10, 1770), better known as Saif ud-Daulah succeeded his younger brother Nawab Nazim Najimuddin Ali Khan, after his death in 1766, as the Nawab Nazim of Bengal and Bihar.

He was the third son of Mir Jafar by Munny Begum. He was only seventeen when he was crowned as the Nawab. He reigned under the regency of his mother and died of smallpox on March 10, 1770, during the Great Bengal famine of 1770.

Life

Early life
After the death of Najimuddin Ali Khan, his younger brother Najabat Ali Khan, better known as Saif ud-Daulah, succeeded him and was placed on the Masnad (throne) at the age of 17. The management developed upon his mother, Munny Begum. On May 19, 1766, a treaty was concluded in which the East India Company was to pay him the reduced stipend of 41,86,131 and 9 Anas (1=12 Anas), namely 17,78,854 and 1 Ana for the Nawab's household and  24,07,277 and 8 Anas for the support of the Nizamat.

Later years
Saif ud-Daulah was formally installed on the Khahar Balish, at Murshidabad Fort on May 22, 1766, which was confirmed by Mughal Emperor Shah Alam II on June 27, 1766. However real authority passed into the chamber of the Directors in London who considered that the Nawab and the Government's dignity still resided in the Nawab and his ministers.

Death and succession
In 1770, during Bengal famine of 1770, a great epidemic of small pox raged in Murshidabad and killing 63,000 of its inhabitants, one of them being Nawab Nazim Saif ud-Daulah, himself. He died on March 10, 1770. His mortal remains lie in the Jafarganj Cemetery in Murshidabad.

He was succeeded by his half-brother, Nawab Nazim Ashraf Ali Khan as the next Nawab.

See also
 List of rulers of Bengal
 History of Bengal
 History of Bangladesh
 History of India
 Shia Islam in India

Notes
 

1750 births

1770 deaths
Nawabs of Bengal
18th-century Indian monarchs
Deaths from smallpox
Infectious disease deaths in India